The March to the Drina is a Serbian patriotic march which was composed by Stanislav Binički during World War I. Binički dedicated it to his favourite commander in the Serbian Army, Col. Milivoje Stojanović, who had fought during the Battle of Cer, but was killed later in the Battle of Kolubara. The song experienced widespread popularity during and after the war and came to be seen by Serbs as a symbol of resistance to the Central Powers. Following World War II, it was popular in Socialist Yugoslavia where a single release in 1964 achieved Gold Record status. The march was played at the presentation ceremony for the Nobel Prize in Literature when Yugoslav writer Ivo Andrić was named a Nobel laureate in 1961.

Serbian lyrics to the song were written many decades after Binički composed it, by poet and journalist Miloje Popović, in 1964 to commemorate the 50th anniversary of the Battle of Cer. English lyrics were added in 1964 by American songwriter Vaughn Horton for a recording by Patti Page under the title Drina (Little Soldier Boy). German lyrics were added by Walter Rothenburg in 1964 and Bert Olden in 1976. Italian lyrics were added in 1964 by Daniele Pace for the recording by Marie Laforêt.

An eponymous 1964 Yugoslav film was made by the Avala Film studio in Belgrade that featured the march in a historical dramatization of the 1914 Battle of Cer.

History

World War I

The Drina River is an important symbol of Serbian national identity, serving as the boundary between Bosnia and Serbia. By the outbreak of World War I, Bosnia had been under the control of Austria-Hungary since 1878. The Serbian defeat of Austro-Hungarian forces at the Battle of Cer in August 1914 was the first Allied victory over the Central Powers during World War I. Stanislav Binički composed what became known as March on the Drina shortly after the battle to commemorate the Serbian victory. He dedicated it to his favourite commander in the army, Pukovnik or Colonel Milivoje Stojanović Brka, who fought at the Battle of Cer but who was killed in a subsequent battle in December. His composition was initially titled March to Victory. Some scholars have hypothesized that Binički based his work on an Ottoman Turkish military march. March on the Drina symbolized the desire of Serbs in the Kingdom of Serbia to unite with those living in Bosnia. The song experienced widespread popularity during and after World War I. It was seen as a symbol of Serbian resistance to the Central Powers and became one of the most famous Serbian nationalist songs, as described by author Eric D. Gordy.

Post-war
The song was popular in Socialist Yugoslavia during the Josip Broz Tito era after World War II. It was released as a single and other formats on the Zagreb-based Yugoton label in Croatia. The recording by Ansambl Urosevic was awarded a Zlatna Ploca or Gold Record for their single release on Jugoton. The Communist film studio Avala also released a film in 1964 based on the march which featured the tune. Moreover, at the height of the Yugoslav Communist or Josip Broz Tito era, a journalist published Serbian lyrics to the song in 1964. It was played at the presentation ceremony for the Nobel Prize in Literature when Serbian writer Ivo Andrić was named a Nobel laureate in 1961.

Serbian lyrics to the song were written in 1964 in Socialist Yugoslavia by poet and journalist Miloje Popović to commemorate the 50th anniversary of the Battle of Cer. A Yugoslavian war film based on the events of World War I, also titled March on the Drina, was released the same year.

The Socialist Party of Serbia used the song as the soundtrack for an important promotional spot on Serbian television prior to the 1992 Serbian general elections. That year, the song was chosen to be the national anthem of Serbia. The Serbian National Assembly later bypassed the decision, deeming the song too provocative and adopted the royalist anthem Bože pravde instead.

In 2013, the song was at the centre of a controversy after it was performed by a Serbian choir entertaining the United Nations General Assembly. Vuk Jeremić, the President of the United Nations General Assembly, Ban Ki-moon, the Secretary-General of the United Nations, and other United Nations officials gave the song a standing ovation. Bosniak organizations responded to the performance by demanding that Jeremić be removed from his position as President of the United Nations General Assembly. Jeremić stated that "we [Serbs] are very proud of it [the song] and wanted to share it with the world". He went on to say that "regrettable attempts at twisting the meaning of our musical gift offered to the world last Monday are deeply offensive to the Serbian people". The United Nations later apologized for the ovation and Ban Ki-moon expressed regret that some were offended by the song.

Lyrics
There were many different lyrics set to the music in several languages, English, German, and Italian, including those written in 1964 in Serbian by the poet and journalist Miloje Popović to commemorate the 50th anniversary of the Battle of Cer in Communist or Josip Broz Tito era Yugoslavia. Only four verses of Miloje Popovic's 1964 poem were recorded in 1966 by vocalist Ljubivoje Vidosavljević and the Narodni Orkestar "Carevac".

International hit

The composition became an international hit and a staple of world music. Swedish composer Felix Stahl obtained the rights to the song which he published and promoted. Danish guitarist Jørgen Ingmann had a number one hit on the Danish pop singles chart in 1963 in a version arranged for solo electric guitar on the Swedish Metronome Records label. His recording was also released in West Germany, where it reached #5, in the UK, in France, and in the U.S. on ATCO Records, 6277. Patti Page, The Shadows, Chet Atkins, Frankie Yankovic, Horst Wende, and James Last also recorded the song.

Popular international versions
 Jørgen Ingmann – "Marchen Til Drina" as a Metronome 45 single, B 1575, Denmark, 1963. Charts: #1, Denmark; #5, Germany
 The Shadows – "March to Drina" on the EMI Records album Shadow Music (1966)
 Patti Page – "Drina (Little Soldier Boy)" released as a Columbia 45 A side single, 43078, US; EP in Portugal, CBS 6195, 1964. English lyrics were written by American songwriter Vaughn Horton.
 Chet Atkins – "Drina" on the RCA Victor album From Nashville With Love, 1966
 James Last – on the Polydor LP Trumpet A Go Go, Vol. 3, Germany, 1968; James Last recorded the song in 1988 with Dutch flutist Berdien Stenberg, Flute Fiesta LP, Polydor 837 116-1 
 Marie Laforêt – on the 1964 album Cantante Dagli Occhi D'oro in Italian with lyrics by Daniele Pace, Italy.
 The Nashville String Band featuring Chet Atkins and Homer and Jethro – "Drina" on the eponymous RCA Victor album, 1969
 Frankie Yankovic – "Drina (Little Soldier Boy)" on the CBS LP Saturday Night Polka Party, 1967
 Radomir Mihailović Točak – "Marš..." on the EP "Marš..." / "...na Drinu" (PGP RTB 1984), Yugoslavia
Les Compagnons de la chanson as a Polydor 45 single in 1964 with German lyrics by Walter Rothenburg
 Lill-Jorgen Petersen released the song in a trumpet arrangement on Columbia in Sweden.
 Laibach – "Mars on River Drina" on the album NATO (1994), Slovenia, released on the Mute label, based in London
 The Jokers – "Drina" as a Discostar and Brunswick 45 single, Belgium, 1963
 The Spotnicks – "Drina" as a 45 single on Swedisc and W & G, Sweden; on CNR in the Netherlands as "Drina Mars", 1964. Rerecorded in 1977. Charts: #8, the Netherlands, 1964.
 Leon Young String Chorale- "Drina" as a 45 single, UK, Columbia, 7236, 1964
 Will Glahé's Bohème Ballhouse Band – "Drina Marsch" on Decca LP, 1964; 45 A side single, Decca D 19473, West Germany, 1963. 
 Bert Landers & Konrad Grewe – "Drina Marsch" from the album Schlager-Cocktail: Die 16 Spitzenschlager
 Horst Wende und sein Orchester – "Drina Marsch", Polydor 52 172, 7" 45 single, Germany, 1963; Roberto Delgado, pseudonym of Horst Wende, released as 45 single with picture sleeve in Italy as by Roberto Delgado e la sua orchestra, "March to Drina", Polydor 52172 
 Die Kirmesmusikanten – "Drina Marsch", 7" 45 single, RCA, Germany, 1975.
 Gunter Noris und die Big Band der Bundeswehr – WM-Parade, CBS 80218, Germany, 1974
 Jack Bulterman – "Drina" as an A side 45 picture sleeve single, 1963, Netherlands
 Arne Domnerus Sekstett – on the LP Ja, Vi Älskar, Zarepta ZA 36010, Norway, 1978
 South African organist Cherry Wainer – on the LP Musik Im Blut, Discoton 75289, Germany; Hammond Organ: Light and Lively, double LP album, Polydor, 583 570, UK, 1964; Rhythmus im Blut LP, Polydor, 237 359, Germany, 1967; Cherry Wainer and Her Magic Hammond Organ LP, on Polydor, 236 036, 1967; Hammond Non Stop LP, Polydor Special 2418–188, 1969
 Bauernkapelle Mindersdorf – on the album In der Musikscheune, Tyrolis, Germany, 2008
 Captain Harp – on the LP Harmonica Highlights as "Drina-Marsch" as part of "Balkan Medley" by the Picca-Trio in an arrangement for harmonica, ZYX Music, 2010
 Henry Arland and Hans Bertram – "Drina Marsch (Mars na Drini)", or "Drina (In den Bergen singt der Wind)", on the LP Clarinet Fascination, Polydor, 2371 208, 1972
 Bob Kaper's The Beale Street Jazz Band – "Drina-March" b/w "Dominique", 45 picture sleeve single, RCA , Dutch Amsterdam pressing.
 Ansambl "Urosevic" featuring violinist Vlastimir Pavlovic Carevac, on Metronome in Sweden, on Jugoton in Yugoslavia, 1963
 Franca Siciliano as "Drina" on Silver Record, XP 616, backed with "Ma cos'hai?" in Italy in 1966
 Czech guitarist Karel Duba in 1966 on Supraphon 
 South African version of "March on the Drina" as "Drina March" by Dan Hill and Sounds Electronic, '8' LP, 42 Great Hits Perfect For Dancing, on RPM Records, 1037 S, 1969
 Fischer Choir, Fischer-Chöre, as "Drina-Marsch" on the Polydor album Das Große Spiel, The Great Game, Polydor 2371 500, Germany, 1974. The orchestra was under the direction of Hans Bertram. This vocal version features German lyrics written by Walter Rothenburg
 Czech vocalist Karel Gott on the album Singet und freut euch des Lebens, as "Drina-Marsch" with lyrics by Bert Olden, Polydor, 2371695, 1976
 The Dutch band Boemerang recorded the song as "Drina Mars" on the various artists album 84 Heerlijke Hollandse Hittroeven released in 2001
 German trumpeter Walter Scholz on the 2012 collection Rosen nur für dich as "Drina"

Notes

References

External links
 Audio Recording
 Mars na Drinu (1964) at IMDB.
 1963 recording by Jorgen Ingmann on Metronome Records.
 1964 recording by Cherry Wainer on Hammond organ on Polydor Records. 
 1967 recording by Frankie Yankovic on Columbia Records.

Serbian patriotic songs
Culture of Republika Srpska
Military marches
Serbia in World War I
Songs of World War I
Cultural depictions of Serbian men
Songs written by George Vaughn Horton